The Norwegian Union of Social Educators and Social Workers (FO) is a trade union in Norway representing workers in a range of professions relating to social care and education.

The union was founded in 1992, when the Norwegian Nurses' Union merged with the Norwegian Social Workers' Union and the Norwegian Union of Child Welfare Educators.  It initially had 8,455 members, and like all its predecessors, it affiliated to the Norwegian Confederation of Trade Unions.  By 2019, it had 30,077 members.

Presidents
1992: Oddrun Remvik
2002: Randi Reese
2010: Rigmor Hogstad
2014: Mimmi Kvisvik

References

External links

Norwegian Confederation of Trade Unions
Trade unions established in 1992
Trade unions in Norway